Chris Blackshear (born March 11, 1974) is a Republican American politician who has served in the Alabama House of Representatives from the 80th district since his victory in a special election in 2016.  He was elected to a full term in 2018.

References

1974 births
Living people
Republican Party members of the Alabama House of Representatives
21st-century American politicians